Ventsislav Ivanov (born 20 May 1982) is a Bulgarian former footballer and currently manager of Belasitsa Petrich.

Career
He had previously played for Belasitsa Petrich and Chernomorets Burgas. He signed with Montana in January 2008.

During the 2008-09 season Ivanov became the topscorer of the Bulgarian second division with 20 goals in 29 matches, helping the side achieve promotion to the top division.

On 4 January 2017, Ivanov signed with Cypriot club Akritas Chlorakas.

On 11 July 2017, Ivanov joined Spartak Pleven.

References

External links
 
 

1982 births
Living people
Bulgarian footballers
Association football forwards
First Professional Football League (Bulgaria) players
Second Professional Football League (Bulgaria) players
Cypriot First Division players
Cypriot Second Division players
Úrvalsdeild karla (football) players
FC Hebar Pazardzhik players
PFC Belasitsa Petrich players
PFC Chernomorets Burgas players
FC Montana players
AEP Paphos FC players
PFC Minyor Pernik players
Knattspyrnufélagið Víkingur players
FC Botev Vratsa players
Akritas Chlorakas players
PFC Spartak Pleven players
Bulgarian expatriate footballers
Bulgarian expatriate sportspeople in Cyprus
Expatriate footballers in Cyprus
Expatriate footballers in Iceland